Maqueen Joyce Letsoha-Mathae is a South African politician who is currently serving in the Free State Executive Council as the Member of the Executive Council (MEC) for Community Safety, Roads and Transport. She was appointed to the position on 14 March 2023. A day earlier, Letsoha-Mathae was sworn in as a Member of the Free State Provincial Legislature. She is a member of the African National Congress.

References

Living people
Year of birth missing (living people)
Sotho people
Members of the Free State Provincial Legislature
African National Congress politicians
Women members of provincial legislatures of South Africa